The origin of the name Kainuu has been disputed among Finnish historians and linguistics. Kainuu is a region of Finland. The reason for the controversy is the speculated connection between areas known as Kainuu and Kvenland, both historical lands in Fennoscandia.

Theory one: Swampy land

As a part of his theory about the origin of the name "kven", Jouko Vahtola, a professor of history at Oulu University, suggested that the name "kainuu" had the same origin. Vahtola constructed a hypothetical proto-Germanic word "*χwainō" that meant "swampy land" (related to English whin). *χwainō derives from Proto-Indo-European *ḱʷeyn-, so the borrowing might have happened early on, but there is no evidence that the word "kainuu" was ever used to mean "swampy land" in any Finnish dialect.

Theory two: Hole

Jorma Koivulehto, Professor of Germanic Philology at the University of Helsinki, has proposed that "kainuu" was originally the same as "*gain-", a Germanic word for a hole or mouth. With the meaning "water-route" or "water-body", *Kainu- was originally a toponymic prefix in southwestern Finland, and during the Iron Age it was gradually established as the name of the land surrounding the northern coast of the Gulf of Bothnia. Linguistically this etymology is seen as more acceptable. The area originally known as Kainuu seems to have been the central part of Ostrobothnia where Karelians had access to the Gulf of Bothnia in the Middle Ages.

Noteworthy in this context is the word "kainu", which is used only in lower Satakunta in Finland. It had a completely different meaning, referring to the middle stake in a work sled, but also clearly derives from *gain-.

Theory three: Sami background 

There are words in Sami languages that sound similar to "kainuu". In North Samic, Gáidnu is a rope made of roots for boats or fishing nets; Gáidnulaŝ refers to a clumsy person; and Geaidnu is a road or a way. In a Saami dictionary of 1780, Kainolats had the meaning "Norwegian or Swedish man" while Kainalats had the meaning "Norwegian or Swedish woman", though it could also have the meaning "peasant". Helsingby or Torneå was referred to as Cainho. These words seem to stem from Proto-Samic keajnō, "road, way, means, method".

See also 
 Etymology of Kven
 Kainuu

References 

Historiography of Finland
Kainuu
Kainuu
Kainuu